Fadhlina binti Sidek (born 16 October 1977) is a Malaysian politician and lawyer who has served as the Minister of Education in the Pakatan Harapan (PH) administration under Prime Minister Anwar Ibrahim since December 2022 and the Member of Parliament (MP) for Nibong Tebal since November 2022. She served as a Senator from September 2021 to her resignation in November 2022. She is a member of the People's Justice Party (PKR), a component party of the PH coalition. She has also served as the Women Chief of PKR since July 2022. She is also the first female Minister of Education.

Prior to her career in politics, Fadhlina was an activist and lawyer who specialised in Islamic family law and child welfare. She also had her own Sharia law firm, Tetuan Fadhlina Siddiq & Associates.

Early life and education 
Fadhlina is the daughter of the late Dr Siddiq Fadzil, former President of the Islamic Youth Association of Malaysia (Abim). She received her early education at Sekolah Rendah Kebangsaan Semenyih before completing her secondary education at Sekolah Agama Menengah Hulu Langat, Kajang, Selangor in 1994. She went on to study at the International Islamic University of Malaysia (UIA), where she received her LLB and LLB (Sharia) degrees in 2002, and her LLM from the National University of Malaysia in 2008.

Career 
Fadhlina began her political career in 2020 when she joined the PKR party and was appointed as the Chairman of the Women's Bureau of Law and Community Development. She was also elected as the party's Women's Chief in July of the same year. In September 2021, she was appointed to the Senate to represent the state of Pulau Pinang.

In the 2022 general election, she was the PKR candidate for the Nibong Tebal parliamentary seat and was successful in defeating the incumbent, Mansor Othman of the PN, by a margin of 16,293 votes.

Personal life 
Fadhlina is married to Mohd Fadzli Arsad and they have six children.

Election results

References 

1977 births
Living people
21st-century Malaysian women politicians
Malaysian women lawyers
People's Justice Party (Malaysia) politicians
Sharia lawyers